The 2016 Mountain West Conference baseball tournament will take place from May 25 through 29.  All seven of the league's teams will meet in the double-elimination tournament to be held at University of New Mexico's Santa Ana Star Field.  The winner of the tournament will earn the Mountain West Conference's automatic bid to the 2016 NCAA Division I baseball tournament.

Format and seeding
The conference's seven teams will be seeded based on winning percentage during the round robin regular season schedule.  The bottom two seeds will play a single-elimination game prior to the main six-team bracket.  The top two seeds will receive a bye to the second round, with the top seed playing the lowest seeded team that won its first round game, and the second seeded team playing the higher seeded first day winner.  The losers of the first day's games will play an elimination game in the double-elimination format.

Bracket

References

Tournament
Mountain West Conference baseball tournament
Mountain West Conference baseball tournament
Mountain West Conference baseball tournament